A world record is usually the best global performance ever recorded and verified in a specific skill or sport.

World Record may also refer to:e
 World Record (Lower Than Atlantis album) (2011)
 [[World Record (Neil Young & Crazy Horse album)|World Record (Neil Young & Crazy Horse album)]] (2022)
 World Record (Van der Graaf Generator album) (1976)
 "World Record" (The Animatrix), a segment of The Animatrix World Record Club, a defunct UK mail-order record company

See also
 Guinness World Records'', a reference book listing world and national records